Omemee means pigeon in some Native American languages and may refer to:

 Omemee, Ontario
 Omemee, North Dakota